Francesco Cini (1610 – May 1684) was a Roman Catholic prelate who served as Bishop of Macerata e Tolentino (1660–1684).

Biography
Francesco Cini was born in Osimo, Italy, in 1610 and ordained as a priest on 26 September 1660.
On 15 November 1660, he was appointed during the papacy of Pope Alexander VII as Bishop of Macerata e Tolentino. 
On 21 November 1660, he was consecrated bishop by Giulio Cesare Sacchetti, Cardinal-Bishop of Sabina, with Ottaviano Carafa, Titular Archbishop of Patrae, and Giovanni Agostino Marliani, Bishop Emeritus of Accia and Mariana, serving as co-consecrators. He served as Bishop of Macerata e Tolentino until his death in May 1684.

See also
Catholic Church in Italy

References

External links and additional sources
 (for Chronology of Bishops) 
 (for Chronology of Bishops) 

17th-century Italian Roman Catholic bishops
Bishops appointed by Pope Alexander VII
1610 births
1684 deaths